Christopher Penfold is an English scriptwriter and editor.

Television shows on which he has worked include Pathfinders, One by One, All Creatures Great and Small, EastEnders, Casualty, The Brack Report, the second season of John Christopher's The Tripods, and thirteen series of Midsomer Murders. He also wrote the film Take Me High.

Penfold is perhaps best known for being one of the brains behind Gerry Anderson's science fiction series Space: 1999. He worked as story consultant for the original series (first 16 episodes of the 24-part series) and is credited for writing "Guardian of Piri" (based on a script by David Weir), "Alpha Child" (based on a script by Edward di Lorenzo), "The Last Sunset", "War Games", "Space Brain" and "Dragon's Domain" for the first series and "Dorzak" as a freelance contributor for the second. Penfold was uncredited for re-writing the series' premiere "Breakaway" as well as David Weir's "Black Sun" and fellow staff member Edward di Lorenzo's "Missing Link".

In 2010, Christopher Penfold contributed a foreword to the novel Space: 1999 Omega and its sequel novel Space: 1999 Alpha. Both novels were written by William Latham and published by Powys Media, and were released simultaneously on 27 February 2010. Penfold is thanked in the ending credits of the Jonathan Glazer 2013 film Under the Skin.

References

External links

Profile at Space 1999

Australian screenwriters
Australian science fiction writers
Australian television producers
English television editors
Year of birth missing (living people)
Living people
Alumni of the University of Cambridge